Boca Burger is a veggie burger produced by Kraft Heinz in Chicago, Illinois. Like all of Boca Foods' products, Boca Burgers serve as a meat alternative.

History

The Boca Foods Company began in 1979 with the vegetarian "Sun Burger" product, as one of the first frozen, plant-based burger replacement products. Over the next decade, more burgers were introduced, as well as meatless versions of ground beef, chicken nuggets, various toppings on pizza, chili, lasagna, and sausages. Organic versions of some Boca products appeared in 2001.

Then Kraft Foods, the United States' largest packaged foods company, announced in early 2000 that it had reached agreement to purchase Boca Burger, Inc., a privately held manufacturer and marketer of soy-based meat alternatives. The announcement was made when Kraft Foods was represented by Gordon James and Clifford A. Wolff. The products are sold in the United States through retail grocery and club stores, natural foods stores and food service channels nationwide. Boca Burger, based in Chicago, Illinois, had 1999 revenues of about $40 million, almost double the previous year. By 2002, sales had grown to $70 million per year.

As of April 2020, Boca also offers meatless skillet meals.

Awards

See also

 List of meat substitutes
 List of vegetarian and vegan companies
 Veganism
 Veggie burger

References

External links
 

Kraft Foods brands
Meat substitutes
Vegetarian companies and establishments of the United States
Soy product brands
Food and drink introduced in 1979